The following lists events that happened during 2003 in Republic of Albania.

Incumbents 
 President: Alfred Moisiu
 Prime Minister: Fatos Nano

Events

January 
 Albania and EU begin Stabilisation and Association Agreement talks, seen as possible first step in long road to EU membership.

October 
 12 October – Started Albanian Wikipedia.

Deaths 
 13 March – Abas Ermenji, Albanian historian and politician (born 1913)
 22 July – Dhimitër Shuteriqi, Albanian writer (born 1915)

See also
 2003 in Albanian television

References 

 
Years of the 21st century in Albania
2000s in Albania